Yue (Old Chinese: *), also known as Yuyue, was a state in ancient China which existed during the first millennium BC  the Spring and Autumn and Warring States periods of China's Zhou dynasty  in the modern provinces of Zhejiang, Shanghai and Jiangsu. Its original capital was Kuaiji (modern Shaoxing); after its conquest of Wu, Yue relocated its court north to the city of Wu (modern-day Suzhou). Yue was conquered by Chu in 306 BC.

History

A specific kingdom, which had been known as the "Yue Guo" in modern Zhejiang, was not mentioned until it began a series of wars against its northern neighbor Wu during the late 6th century BC. According to the Records of the Grand Historian and Discourses of the States, the Yue are descended from Wuyu, the son of Shao Kang which as known as the sixth king of the Xia dynasty.

With help from Wu's enemy Chu, Yue was able to be victorious after several decades of conflict. The famous Yue King Goujian destroyed and annexed Wu in 473 BC. During the reign of Wuqiang, six generations after Goujian, Yue was partitioned by Chu and Qi in 306 BC.

During its existence, Yue was famous for the quality of its metalworking, particularly its swords. Examples include the extremely well-preserved Swords of Goujian and Zhougou.

The Yue state appears to have been a largely indigenous political development in the lower Yangtze. This region corresponds with that of the old corded-ware Neolithic, and it continued to be one that shared a number of practices, such as tooth extraction, pile building, and cliff burial. Austronesian speakers also still lived in the region down to its conquest and sinification beginning about 240 BC.

What set the Yue apart from other Sinitic states of the time was their possession of a navy. Yue culture was distinct in its practice of naming boats and swords. A Chinese text described the Yue as a people who used boats as their carriages and oars as their horses.

Rulers of Yue family tree
 Their ancestral name is rendered variously as either Si or Luo (雒 or 駱).

Aftermath

After the fall of Yue, the ruling family moved south to what is now northern Fujian and set up the Minyue kingdom. This successor state lasted until around 150 BC, when it miscalculated an alliance with the Han dynasty.

Mingdi, Wujiang's second son, was appointed minister of Wucheng (present-day Huzhou's Wuxing District) by the king of Chu. He was titled Marquis of Ouyang Ting, from a pavilion on the south side of Ouyu Mountain. The first Qin dynasty emperor Qin Shi Huang abolished the title after his conquest of Chu in 223 BC, but descendants and subjects of its former rulers took up the surnames Ou, Ouyang, and Ouhou in remembrance.

When the religious leader Xu Chang launched a rebellion against the Han dynasty in 172 CE, he declared the state of Yue restored and appointed his father Xu Sheng as "King of Yue". The rebels were crushed in 174.

Astronomy
In Chinese astronomy, there are two stars named for Yue:

Yue (along with Wu) is represented by the star Zeta Aquilae in the "Left Wall" of the Heavenly Market enclosure
Yue is also represented by the star Psi Capricorni or 19 Capricorni in the "Twelve States" of the mansion of the Girl.

Biology
The virus genus Yuyuevirus and the virus family Yueviridae are both named after the state.

People from Yue
Yuenü, swordswoman & author of the earliest-known exposition on swordplay
Xi Shi, a famous beauty of the ancient Yue Guo.

Language

Possible languages spoken in the state of Yue may have been of Tai-Kadai and Austronesian origins. Li Hui (2001) identifies 126 Tai-Kadai cognates in Maqiao Wu dialect spoken in the suburbs of Shanghai out of more than a thousand lexical items surveyed. According to the author, these cognates are likely traces of 'old Yue language' (gu Yueyu 古越語).

See also
Tai languages
Tai-Kadai languages
Austronesian languages
Austro-Tai languages
Tai peoples
Austronesian peoples
Austro-Tai peoples
Baiyue
Minyue
Wu (state)
Dong'ou Kingdom
Âu Việt

References

Sources

Further reading

Zhengzhang Shangfang 1999. "An Interpretation of the Old Yue Language Written in Goujiàn's Wéijiă lìng" [句践"维甲"令中之古越语的解读]. In Minzu Yuwen 4, pp. 1–14.
Zhengzhang Shangfang 1998. "Gu Yueyu" 古越語 [The old Yue language]. In Dong Chuping 董楚平 et al. Wu Yue wenhua zhi 吳越文化誌 [Record of the cultures of Wu and Yue]. Shanghai: Shanghai renmin chubanshe, 1998, vol. 1, pp. 253–281.
Zhengzhang Shangfang 1990. "Some Kam-Tai Words in Place Names of the Ancient Wu and Yue States" [古吴越地名中的侗台语成份]. In Minzu Yuwen 6.

External links
Eric Henry: The Submerged History of Yuè (Sino-Platonic Papers 176, May 2007)

 
334 BC
4th-century BC disestablishments in China
History of Jiangsu
History of Shanghai
History of Zhejiang
Shaoxing
States and territories disestablished in the 4th century BC